Per Schreiner (14 July 1932 – 28 October 2005) was a Norwegian economist and civil servant.

He was born in Oslo as a son of Fredrik Schreiner (1905–1988) and Signy Rønneberg (1903–1983). He was a grandson of Kristian and Alette Schreiner and a nephew of Johan Schreiner.

After finishing his secondary education in 1950, he enrolled at the University of Oslo whence he graduated in with the cand.oecon. degree in 1958. He was then a researcher and assistant at the University of Oslo, the Centraal Planbureau and Stanford University. He was hired as a consultant in the Ministry of Finance in 1963, and was quickly promoted to assistant secretary in 1965 and deputy under-secretary of state in 1971. From 1989 he was again a consultant, before leaving in 1992. He then spent some time studying at Harvard University and working for the consultant company Econ.

He was also a board member of Pax Forlag. He died in October 2005 in Oslo.

References

1932 births
2005 deaths
Civil servants from Oslo
University of Oslo alumni
Norwegian economists
Norwegian expatriates in the Netherlands
Norwegian expatriates in the United States